Nico Aaltonen (born June 15, 1988) is a Finnish former professional ice hockey player. He played in the SM-liiga with Lukko, Ässät, HPK and Espoo Blues.

Playing career
Aaltonen joined Espoo Blues on a try-out contract on August 1, 2014 which was followed by him joining Arlan Kokshetau in 2015. The same year, he joined the Manchester Phoenix of the English Premier Ice Hockey League.

Career statistics

Regular season and playoffs

International

References

External links

1988 births
Living people
Arlan Kokshetau players
Ässät players
Espoo Blues players
Finnish ice hockey left wingers
Hokki players
HPK players
Kiekko-Vantaa players
Lempäälän Kisa players
Manchester Phoenix players
People from Lappeenranta
Lukko players
Mikkelin Jukurit players
Vaasan Sport players
Sportspeople from South Karelia